A baghlah, bagala, bugala or baggala is a large deep-sea dhow, a traditional Arabic sailing vessel. The name "baghla" means "mule" in the Arabic language.

Description

The baghlah dhows had a curved prow with a stem-head, an ornately carved stern and quarter galleries.
Usually they had two masts using two to three lateen sails; supplementary sails like a jib were often added on the bowsprit, as well as on a topmast atop the main mast. 
As a large and heavy ship the baghlah required a crew of at least 30 sailors. Some had even up to 40.

The ghanjah or kotiya is a similar type of vessel, often difficult to distinguish from the baghlah.

History
Baghlahs were widely used in the past centuries as merchant ships in the Indian Ocean and the minor seas around the Arabian Peninsula. They reached eastwards to Sindh, India and up to the Bay of Bengal and further beyond as far as the Spice Islands. Southwestwards they reached down to the East African coast. They were one of the main types of ship used by the Bohra traders.

In the early 19th century these ships were also part of pirate fleets operating from semi-independent or completely independent harbours in Persia or along the Arabian Peninsula.

During the 19th century, the Royal Navy attempted to suppress the Indian Ocean slave trade and in his 1873 book, Captain G. L. Sulivan described the "Bugala or genuine Dhow" as "by far the most numerous class" of dhow.

In favorable conditions a baghlah could sail up to 9 knots, but it was a somewhat unwieldy ship and was largely replaced by the easier to maneuver boom in the 20th century.

See also
Persian Gulf campaign of 1809
Boom (ship)
Ghanjah
Shu'ai

References

External links

Hikoichi Yajima, The Arab dhow trade in the Indian Ocean : preliminary report
“The first traditional Dhow Exhibition” in Qatar

Dhow types
Sailing ships
Arab inventions